Research & Education Association (REA) publishes test preparation materials and study guides, both in print and electronic form.

History
REA was founded by Max Fogiel in 1959 as an educational publisher, concentrating on problems and solutions, or what's known as test preparation today. The company produced the iconic "Problem Solver" series of comprehensive solution guides. The Problem Solver series eventually encompassed over 30 topics with more than 28,000 problem/solution sets, covering differential equations, electric circuits, electronic circuits, precalculus, calculus, advanced calculus, algebra and trigonometry, physics, linear algebra, statistics, organic chemistry, mechanics, thermodynamics, electromagnetics, geometry, chemistry, probability, materials strength, heat transfer, economics, robotics, discrete math, fluid mechanics and dynamics, numerical analysis, optics, topology, electronic communications, operations research, and several others.

Recently REA has focused on providing digital test banks through its online study center. The company has specific test-prep modules for some of America's most well known standardized tests, including the GED test, the College Board's CLEP credit-by-exam and Advanced Placement exam programs, and the ACT college admissions test.

The printing company Courier Corporation acquired REA in 2003. Courier was acquired by RR Donnelley in 2015. RR Donnelly split into three in 2016; REA became part of LSC Communications.

See also
 Educational Testing Service
 Standardized test
 Teaching to the test
 List of standardized tests in the United States
 Test (assessment)

References

External links
 
 Nonprofit test bank of REA analog, DOE and other test bank/ exam preparation resources
 REA About.com Facebook link to test preparation hints

Educational publishing companies
Standardized tests in the United States
Educational testing and assessment organizations
Educational psychology organizations